K-1 World GP 2014 –65 kg Championship Tournament was a kickboxing event held on November 3, 2014, at the Yoyogi National Gymnasium in Tokyo, Japan.

Background
This event featured 8-Man tournament for the inaugural K-1 -65kg Championship, and other super fights.

Results

K-1 World GP 2014 -65kg Championship Tournament bracket

See also
List of K-1 events
List of K-1 champions

References

K-1 events
2014 in kickboxing